2011–12 Ligue Nationale de Handball Division 1 season was the 60th since its establishment. Montpellier were the defending champions, having won their title the previous season.

Team information

League table 

Pld - Played; W - Won; L - Lost; PF - Points for; PA - Points against; Diff - Difference; Pts - Points.

Statistics

Top scorers

References

External links
LNH site

Handball leagues in France
2011–12 domestic handball leagues